Fatsia polycarpa, the many-fruited aralia, is a species of flowering plant in the family Araliaceae, endemic to Taiwan, where it is threatened by habitat loss. Spherical clusters of cream or white flowers are produced in winter, followed by black fruits in spring.

Fatsia polycarpa is cultivated as an ornamental plant. In temperate climates it can be grown outside in a sheltered spot without frost. Otherwise it should be grown under glass in bright light, but not direct sunlight. The cultivar 'Green Fingers' is slightly more tender and has slightly narrower leaves.

References

Endemic flora of Taiwan
polycarpa
Near threatened plants
Taxonomy articles created by Polbot